The line of succession to the Norwegian throne consists of people entitled to become head of state of Norway.

The succession is currently governed by Article 6 of the Constitution, altered most recently in 1990 to introduce absolute primogeniture among the grandchildren and further eligible descendants of King Harald V. The King's children are ranked according to male-preference cognatic primogeniture, which was given between 1971 and 1990; Crown Prince Haakon and his eligible descendants thus take precedence over his older sister, Princess Märtha Louise, and her eligible descendants.

Only legitimate descendants of the reigning monarch and the reigning monarch's siblings and their legitimate descendants can be in line to the throne. However, the King's elder sister, Princess Astrid and her descendants, along with descendants of the King's deceased eldest sister, Princess Ragnhild, are excluded from the line of succession due to the agnatic primogeniture which was not given prior to 1971.

In the event that there is no-one in the line of succession, the Storting (Parliament) has the right to elect a successor under Article 7 (if the king is alive) or Article 48 (if the king has died).

Upon acceding to the throne (and being of age), the Norwegian monarch is required by Article 9 of the Constitution to take an oath before members of the Storting.

Line of succession 

 King Harald V (born 1937)
 (1) Crown Prince Haakon (b. 1973)
 (2) Princess Ingrid Alexandra (b. 2004)
 (3) Prince Sverre Magnus (b. 2005)
 (4) Princess Märtha Louise (b. 1971)
 (5) Maud Angelica Behn (b. 2003)
 (6) Leah Isadora Behn (b. 2005)
 (7) Emma Tallulah Behn (b. 2008)

See also

Norwegian Law of Succession

References

Norwegian throne
Norwegian monarchy
Succession